Monster Moves is a British documentary television series which began airing in 2005. A total 31 episodes have been produced across 6 seasons so far.

Format
Each episode follows the high risk jobs of moving teams on their journeys to relocate houses, ships, trains and even whole towns across land and sea. Before the starting credits a short summary of the task to be accomplished is shown. Following these credits, the move team leader is introduced and they explain the various possibilities for moving the structure. Computer generated imagery showcases the possibility of things to go wrong with each of the possible scenarios. The rest of the episode follows the move team as they move the structure by their chosen method of transportation. Each episode also includes a song with original lyrics describing the move(s) being followed.

Episodes

Summary
{| class="wikitable" style="text-align:center;"
|-
! colspan="2" rowspan="2" style="width:50px;" |Season
! rowspan="2" style="width:50px;" |Episodes
! colspan="2" style="width:400px;"|Originally aired
|-
! style="width:200px;" | Season premiere
! style="width:200px;" | Season finale
|-
| style="background:#8197B6; height:10px;"|
| 1
| 3
| 
| 
|-
| style="background:#a9c3c7; height:10px;"|
| 2
| 4
| 
| 
|-
| style="background:#284449; height:10px;"|
| 3
| 6
| 
| 
|-
| style="background:#649DB6; height:10px;"|
| 4
| 6
| 
| 
|-
| style="background:#66a0b7; height:10px;"|
| 5
| 6
| 
| 
|-
| style="background:#007fff; height:10px;"|
| 6
| 6
| 
| 
|}

Season 1 (2005)

Season 2 (2006–2007)

Season 3 (2008)

Season 4 (2009)

Season 5 (2011)

Season 6 (2013)

See also
 Big, Bigger, Biggest
 Extreme Engineering
 Mega Movers
 MegaStructures
 Modern Marvels

References

National Geographic (American TV channel) original programming
2005 British television series debuts